Didier Michaud-Daniel was born on February 2, 1958, in Montluçon, France, and is a French business executive. Since March 2012, he has served as CEO of Bureau Veritas, one of the world’s leading providers of testing, inspection and certification services.

Biography

Education 
Didier Michaud-Daniel has a degree in management from the École Supérieure de Commerce de Poitiers, and is also a graduate of INSEAD.

Career

Otis 
Didier Michaud-Daniel began his career at Otis Elevator Company in 1981 in the field of service sales. In 1991, he was named Field Operations Director for Otis France. In 1992, he was promoted to the position of Director of Operations and Sales in Paris. He was appointed Deputy Managing Director of Operations in January 1998.

From September 2001 to August 2004, Michaud-Daniel was Managing Director of Otis UK and Ireland. From 2004 to 2008, he was President of the UK and Central Europe zone for Otis.

In May 2008, he was named President of the Otis Elevator Company.

Bureau Veritas 
In March 2012, Didier Michaud-Daniel was appointed CEO of Bureau Veritas.

Tarkett 
Michaud-Daniel was appointed to Tarkett's supervisory board as a member of the committee on nominations, remuneration and governance in April 2019.

References

1958 births
Living people
20th-century French businesspeople
21st-century French businesspeople
French chief executives